The Harem conspiracy was a plot to assassinate the Egyptian pharaoh Ramesses III in 1155 BC. The principal figure behind the plot was one of the pharaoh's secondary wives, Tiye, who hoped to place her son Pentawer on the throne instead of the pharaoh's chosen successor Ramesses IV, but mainly organized by the court official Pebekkamen. The plotters succeeded in killing the pharaoh but failed to establish Pentawer on the throne. In the aftermath, the leading conspirators were convicted and executed.

Ramesses III

Ramesses III was born during the Twentieth Dynasty to his father Pharaoh Setnakhte and mother Queen Tiy-merenese. His father Setnakhte came to the throne by rescuing Egypt from the hands of foreign powers. After Ramesses II or Ramesses The Great outlived twelve of his sons, Egypt was put in the hands of others. Setnakhte led Egypt into the Twentieth Dynasty. It is said that Ramesses III "entered life destined for the kingship and remained at the pinnacle of society and power throughout". Ramesses III ruled Egypt for 32 years. He had recently relocated to Thebes to celebrate the Heb-Sed, the rejuvenation festival that occurs after a king rules for thirty years and it continues to take place every three years thereafter. It was in Thebes where this great conspiracy was performed.

Conspiracy

On day 15 of month 2 of Shemu 1155 BC, Ramesses III was likely in the royal harem in the Western Tower of  Medinet Habu when the attempt on his life was made. This date was chosen as it coincided with the Beautiful Feast of the Valley; the commotion surrounding the event was used to the advantage of the conspirators.  

A minor wife of the king, Tiye, wished for her son Pentawer to take the throne instead of Ramesses IV, the chosen successor. To achieve this, Tiye enlisted a group of officials throughout the administration as well as servants to help deliver messages beyond the harem. Tiye was also able to convince many of these officials to help act out the two-fold conspiracy. One of the pantry chiefs, Pebekkamen, was responsible for distributing information: 
...he had begun to bring out their word to their mothers and their brothers who were there, saying: 'Stir up the people! Incite enmity in order to make rebellion against their lord!'

Pebekkamen received help from a butler named Mastesuria, the overseer of the cattle Panhayboni, overseer of the harem Panouk, and clerk of the harem Pendua. Since the harem had very restricted access Panhayboni sought out the overseer of the King's treasury, Pairy, to obtain a pass that would allow the conspirators access to the king.

It was once thought that Ramesses III survived the initial attack, only to die some time later. This is due in part to the Judicial Papyrus of Turin, which preserves a record of the trials of the conspirators, being carried out under his name. The document opens with:
[King Usermare'-Meriamun, l.p.h., Son of Re': Ramesses] Ruler of Heliopolis [l.p.h. said]... I commissioned the overseer of the treasury Montemtowe; the overseer of the treasury Pefrowe; the standard-bearer Kara; the butler Paibese, the butler Kedendenna; the butler Ba'almahar; the butler Peirswene; the butler Dhutrekhnefer; the king's adjutant Penernute; the clerk Mai; the clerk of the archives Pre'em-hab; the standard-bearer of the infantry Hori; saying 'As for the matters which the people-I do not know who-have plotted, go and examine them'.

His mummy appeared to show no outward signs of any injuries and his death was presumed to be a natural one. However, recent CT scanning of his mummy reveals that his throat was cut to the bone, severing the trachea, esophagus, and blood vessels, which would be rapidly fatal. This finding confirms the theory that the trial of the conspirators was carried out by Ramesses IV in the name of his father, rather than by Ramesses III himself.

Trial and outcome 

Despite being successful in murdering the king, the plot failed to place Pentawer on the throne. It is possible that other members of the royal family loyal to the future Ramesses IV reacted quickly to outmaneuvre the conspirators. Ramesses IV selected twelve magistrates to investigate and judge the case across five trials. In addition to the chief conspirators named above, those who had knowledge of the conspiracy but did not report it were arrested, tried, and punished. Twenty-eight people were executed. These included Pebekkamen, Mastesuria, Panhayboni, Panouk, Pentua, and Pairy, in addition to other harem officials, scribes, and army officials. Some, such as Pentawer, were allowed to take their own lives. Four, including the two judges and the captain of the police, had their ears and noses cut off for cavorting with the accused women. The punishment of Queen Tiye is not recorded.

The mummy known as 'Unknown Man E' is generally considered to be a son of Ramesses III. The body was not embalmed, but wrapped in a ritually impure goatskin and placed in an uninscribed coffin. Genetic studies confirmed he has the same Y-chromosome haplotype (E1b1a) and shares half his autosomal DNA with Ramesses III, consistent with being his son. It appears that this mummy is that of Pentawer.

Sources

Harem
Ramesses III
Conspiracies
Assassinations in Egypt